Metevtamak (Mätäwtamaq) is a rural locality (a selo) in Karamaly-Gubeyevsky Selsoviet, Tuymazinsky District, Bashkortostan, Russia. The population was 457 as of 2010. There are 4 streets.

Geography 
Metevtamak is located 46 km southeast of Tuymazy (the district's administrative centre) by road. Kalshaly is the nearest rural locality.

References 

Rural localities in Tuymazinsky District